"The Stripper" is an instrumental composed by David Rose, recorded in 1958 and released four years later. It evinces a jazz influence with especially prominent trombone slides, and evokes the feel of music used to accompany striptease artists.

"The Stripper" reached #1 on Billboard'''s Top 100 chart in July 1962. It became a gold record. Billboard ranked the record as the #5 song of 1962.

The tune came to prominence by chance. Rose had recorded "Ebb Tide" as the A-side of a record. His record company, MGM Records, wanted to get it on the market quickly, but discovered there was no B-side available for it. Rose was away at the time the need for the B-side surfaced. An MGM office boy was given the job of going through some of Rose's tapes of unreleased material to find something that would work; he liked "The Stripper" and chose it as the flip side for the record.

 Legacy 

The piece was the theme melody in the Swedish record sales list Kvällstoppen in the 1960s. It also became known as the background music for a contemporary Noxzema Shaving Cream commercial, featuring Swedish model Gunilla Knutsson, and for key scenes in the films The Scarecrow (1973) and Slap Shot (1977). The piece also features in the films The Full Monty (1997) and Wallace & Gromit: The Curse of the Were-Rabbit (2005). It was used on BBC Television in 1976 by the British comedians Morecambe and Wise in their "Breakfast Sketch" routine, where they perform a dance using various kitchen utensils and food items. It was also used on Match Game when Gene Rayburn or one of the panelists began "getting antsy". Professional wrestler Rick Rude used a version for his entrance and disrobing routine in the World Wrestling Federation. 
The band Mötley Crüe used The Stripper to introduce the show on their 1987's Girls, Girls, Girls-Tour as well as at the Moscow Music Peace Festival in 1989.

The British comedy troupe Monty Python used the song in two skits on their show Monty Python's Flying Circus:A beachgoer (Terry Jones) is trying to change into a bathing suit on the beach, only to be exposed as he begins taking his clothes off. His last attempt finds him in front of an audience, to whom he gives a show. As the song ends, the words "It's a man's world, taking your clothes off in public" appear onscreen, echoing the episode's running gag about infringing on the British Army's recruitment slogan.

An economic minister (Terry Jones) gives a report on the British economy while doing a striptease to the song.

The song was put into regular use for British ITV kids series SMTV Live from 1998-2003, most particularly during the "Strippin' Vicar" and "Chums" sketches when the vicars such as one of the hosts Ant McPartlin and one of the guests Frank Skinner destroy the set.

The song is also alleged to have inspired the songwriters for Thomas & Friends, Mike O'Donnell and Junior Campbell, in their composition of Daisy's theme, the first female diesel introduced in the television series.

It was also used once on CBS-ABC game show Match Game'' which host Gene Rayburn and one of the celebrity panelists Betty White had a showdown.

References

External links
 

1962 singles
Billboard Hot 100 number-one singles
Cashbox number-one singles
Erotic dance
1962 songs
MGM Records singles
1960s instrumentals
Compositions by David Rose